Mika Grbavica (born 8 December 2001) is a Croatian volleyball player. She plays as opposite hitter for German club Dresdner SC.

References

External links
 

2001 births
Living people
Croatian women's volleyball players
Sportspeople from Osijek
Expatriate volleyball players in Germany